Rebecca Pan Di-hua (also Poon Tik-wah, Pan Wan Ching) is a Hong Kong actress and singer.

Early life
She was born in Shanghai on 29 December 1931 and moved to Hong Kong in 1949.

Career
Her singing career began in 1957. One of her songs, which she recorded when she was 18, is played briefly in In the Mood for Love — the English version of an Indonesian folk song, "Bengawan Solo".

Discography
 《Pan Wan Ching Sings The Four Seasons  潘迪華與世界名曲》, Diamond Records LP1004, 1961.
 《Oriental Pearls》, Diamond Records LP1006, 1962. Recorded with the Diamond Studio Orchestra conducted by Vic Christobal.
 《The Exciting Rebecca Pan  我的心．潘迪華》, Diamond Records LP1009, 1963.
 《我愛你  (I Love You)》, Diamond Records LP1013, 1964.
 《潘迪華唱  (Rebecca Pan Sings)》, Diamond Records LP1017, 1965.
 《I Am Yours‧Japanese Good-Day Baby‧Till‧First Night Of The Full Moon》, Life Records EP-2001, 1965.
 《Tropical Love Song‧Pachanga‧I Could Have Danced All Night‧Chit Chit Rit Chit》, Life Records EP-2002, 1965.
 《Pan Wan Ching Greatest Hits！ 潘迪華 1965 最新名曲》, Life Records LP-9001/LSP-9001, 1965.
 《潘迪華 - 花弄影‧我永遠等着你》, EMI Parlophone Records, 1965.
 《Rebecca Pan Wan-Ching．Rendezvous On Bridge 潘迪華．情人橋》, EMI Pathe Records 7EPA-182, 1965.
 《Rebecca Pan 潘迪華．When You Were Mine》, EMI Columbia Records ECHK 507, 1966.
 《Rebecca Pan．Essence Of Love 潘迪華．給我一杯愛的咖啡》, EMI Pathe Records S-CPAX-329, 1967.
 《Rebecca Pan．A Man And A Woman 潘迪華．男歡女愛》, EMI Angel Records S-3AEX-326, 1968.
 《Rebecca Pan．Moonlit Villa 潘迪華．月滿西樓》, EMI Angel Records, 1968.
 《潘迪華．東方時代曲 Vol. 1》, Life Records, 1969.
 《Rebecca Pan．How Strange 潘迪華．真稀奇》, Life Records LSP-9005, 1969.
 《Rebecca Pan》, Life Records LELP 1, 1969.
 《我又想起你》, Life Records LSP-9013, 1970.
 《Hong Kong Sound With Rebecca Pan》, Sounds Of Asia Records SOA 001, 1970.
 《Rebecca Live In The Eagle's Nest》, Life Records, 1971.
 《潘迪華．今夜忘不了》, Yangtze Music YTZEP 301, 1971.
 《白孃孃 Pai Niang Niang》, EMI Regal Recordings, 1973
 《White Christmas．Rebecca Pan & The Voices Of Maryknoll》, Man Chi Records MCLP-10201, 1974.

Filmography as actress
 Look for a Star (2009) - Sam's Mother
 Chinese Odyssey 2002 (2002) - Queen Mother
 In the Mood for Love (2000) - Mrs. Suen
 Flowers of Shanghai (1998) - Huang
 Days of Being Wild (1990) (as Tik-Wa Poon) - Rebecca
 Starry Is the Night (1988)
 The Greatest Lover (1988) - Fiona's Mum

See also
 Cinema of Hong Kong

References

External links

Hong Kong film actresses
20th-century Hong Kong women singers
Living people
English-language singers from Hong Kong
1931 births
Singers from Shanghai
Hong Kong television actresses
Actresses from Shanghai
20th-century Hong Kong actresses
21st-century Hong Kong actresses
Pathé Records (Hong Kong) artists